The 2018–19 season was Exeter City's 117th year in existence and their seventh consecutive season in League Two. The club also participated in three cup competitions; the FA Cup, EFL Cup, and EFL Trophy.

The season covers the period from 1 July 2018 to 30 June 2019.

Transfers

Transfers in

Transfers out

Loans in

Loans out

Pre-season 
Exeter City played six pre-season friendlies in July 2018 – all away from home at teams based in South West England – winning five and drawing one. There were no pre-season friendlies at St James Park due to redevelopment work taking place over the summer.

Friendlies

Competitions

League Two

League table

Results summary

Results by matchday

Matches 
On 21 June 2018, the League Two fixtures for the forthcoming season were announced.

FA Cup

The first round draw was made live on BBC by Dennis Wise and Dion Dublin on 22 October.

EFL Cup

On 15 June 2018, the draw for the first round was made in Ho Chi Minh City, Vietnam. The second round draw was made from the Stadium of Light on 16 August.

EFL Trophy 

On 18 July 2018, the final groups for the first round of the 2018–19 EFL Trophy were confirmed, with Exeter being placed in Southern Section Group D. The draw for the second round was made live on Talksport by Leon Britton and Steve Claridge on 16 November.

Table

Squad list 
Includes all players registered to the club for any period of time between 1 July 2018 and 30 June 2019. Players registered with club for entire period unless otherwise noted.

References

Exeter City
Exeter City F.C. seasons